Kyle is an unincorporated community in McDowell County, West Virginia, United States. Kyle has a post office with ZIP code 24855.

The community was named after Jim Kyle, a railroad promoter.

References

Unincorporated communities in McDowell County, West Virginia
Unincorporated communities in West Virginia